Deinonychus is a genus of dromaeosaurid theropod dinosaur with one described species, Deinonychus antirrhopus. Fossils have been recovered from the U.S. states of Montana, Utah, Wyoming, and Oklahoma (in rocks from the Cloverly Formation and Antlers Formation), though teeth possibly belonging to Deinonychus have also been found much farther east in the state of Maryland.

Paleontologist John H. Ostrom's study of Deinonychus in the 1960s revolutionized the way scientists thought about dinosaurs and led to the "Dinosaur Renaissance”, igniting the debate on whether or not dinosaurs were warm-blooded or cold-blooded. Before this, the popular conception of dinosaurs had been one of plodding, semi aquatic, simple-minded reptilian beasts. Ostrom noted that the small body, sleek, horizontal posture, ratite-like spine, and the especially enlarged raptorial claws on its feet suggested that it was an active, agile predator.

"Terrible claw" refers to the unusually large, sickle-shaped talon on the second toe of each foot. The holotype, YPM 5205, preserves a large, strongly curved ungual. In life, archosaurs have a keratinous sheath over this bone to extends its length. The species name antirrhopus means "counter balance", which refers to Ostrom's idea about the function of its tail. As in other dromaeosaurids, the tail vertebrae have a series of ossified tendons and super-elongated bone processes. These features seemed to make the tail a stiff counterbalance, but a fossil of the very closely related Velociraptor mongoliensis (IGM 100/986) has an articulated tail skeleton that is laterally curved in a long S-shape. This suggests that, in life, the tail could laterally bend with a high degree of flexibility. In both the Cloverly and Antlers formations, Deinonychus remains have been found closely associated with those of the ornithopod Tenontosaurus. Teeth associated with Tenontosaurus specimens imply they were hunted, or at least scavenged, by Deinonychus.

Discovery and naming
Fossilized remains of Deinonychus have been recovered from the Cloverly Formation of Montana and Wyoming, as well as the roughly contemporary Antlers Formation of Oklahoma, in the Western United States. The Cloverly formation has been dated to the late Aptian through early Albian ages of the Early Cretaceous, about 115 to 108 Ma. Additionally, teeth found in the Arundel Clay Facies (mid-Aptian), of the Potomac Formation on the Atlantic Coastal Plain of Maryland could be assigned to this genus.

The first remains of Deinonychus were uncovered in 1931 in southern Montana near the town of Billings. The team leader, paleontologist Barnum Brown, was primarily concerned with excavating and preparing the remains of the ornithopod dinosaur Tenontosaurus, but in his field report from the dig site to the American Museum of Natural History, he reported the discovery of a small carnivorous dinosaur close to a Tenontosaurus skeleton, "but encased in lime difficult to prepare." He informally called the animal "Daptosaurus agilis" and made preparations for describing it and having the skeleton, specimen AMNH 3015, put on display, but never finished this work. Brown brought back from the Cloverly Formation the skeleton of a smaller theropod with seemingly oversized teeth that he informally named "Megadontosaurus". John Ostrom, reviewing this material decades later, realized that the teeth came from Deinonychus, but the skeleton came from a completely different animal, which he named Microvenator.

A little more than thirty years later, in August 1964, paleontologist John Ostrom led an expedition from Yale's Peabody Museum of Natural History which discovered more skeletal material near Bridger. Expeditions during the following two summers uncovered more than 1,000 bones, among which were at least three individuals. Since the association between the various recovered bones was weak, making the exact number of individual animals represented impossible to determine properly, the holotype (YPM 5205) of Deinonychus was restricted to the complete left foot and partial right foot that definitively belonged to the same individual. The remaining specimens were catalogued in fifty separate entries at Yale's Peabody Museum, even though they could have been from as few as three individuals.

A later study by Ostrom and Grant E. Meyer analyzed their own material as well as Brown's "Daptosaurus" in detail and found them to be the same species. Ostrom first published his findings in February 1969, giving all the referred remains the new name of Deinonychus antirrhopus. The specific name "antirrhopus", from Greek ἀντίρροπος, means "counterbalancing" and refers to the likely purpose of its stiffened tail. In July 1969, Ostrom published a very extensive monograph on Deinonychus.

Though a myriad of bones was available by 1969, many important ones were missing or hard to interpret. There were few postorbital skull elements, no femurs, no sacrum, no furcula or sternum, missing vertebrae, and (what Ostrom thought to be) a tiny fragment of a coracoid. Ostrom's skeletal reconstruction of Deinonychus included a very unusual pelvic bone—a pubis that was trapezoidal and flat, unlike that of other theropods, but which was the same length as the ischium and found right next to it.

Further findings

In 1974, Ostrom published another monograph on the shoulder of Deinonychus in which he realized that the pubis that he had described was actually a coracoid—a shoulder element. In that same year, another specimen of Deinonychus, MCZ 4371, was discovered and excavated in Montana by Steven Orzack during a Harvard University expedition headed by Farish Jenkins. This discovery added several new elements: well preserved femora, pubes, a sacrum, and better preserved ilia, as well as elements of the pes and metatarsus. Ostrom described this specimen and revised his skeletal restoration of Deinonychus. This time, it showed the very long pubis and Ostrom began to suspect that they may have even been a little retroverted, similar to those of birds.

A skeleton of Deinonychus, including bones from the original (and most complete) AMNH 3015 specimen, can be seen on display at the American Museum of Natural History, with another specimen (MCZ 4371) on display at the Museum of Comparative Zoology at Harvard University. The American Museum and Harvard specimens are from a different locality than the Yale specimens. Even these two skeletal mounts are lacking elements, including the sterna, sternal ribs, furcula, and gastralia.

Even after all of Ostrom's work, several small blocks of lime-encased material remained unprepared in storage at the American Museum. These consisted mostly of isolated bones and bone fragments, including the original matrix, or surrounding rock in which the specimens were initially buried. An examination of these unprepared blocks by Gerald Grellet-Tinner and Peter Makovicky in 2000 revealed an interesting, overlooked feature. Several long, thin bones identified on the blocks as ossified tendons (structures that helped stiffen the tail of dromaeosaurids) turned out to actually represent gastralia (abdominal ribs). More significantly, a large number of previously unnoticed fossilized eggshells were discovered in the rock matrix surrounding the original Deinonychus specimen.

In a subsequent and more detailed report on the eggshells, Grellet-Tinner and Makovicky concluded that the egg almost certainly belonged to Deinonychus, representing the first dromaeosaurid egg to be identified. Moreover, the external surface of one eggshell was found in close contact with the gastralia suggesting that Deinonychus might have brooded its eggs. This implies that Deinonychus used body heat transfer as a mechanism for egg incubation, and indicates an endothermy similar to modern birds. Further study by Gregory Erickson and colleagues finds that this individual was 13 to 14 years old at the time of death and its growth had plateaued. Unlike other theropods in their study of specimens found associated with eggs or nests, it had finished growing at the time of its death.

Implications
Ostrom's description of Deinonychus in 1969 has been described as the most important single discovery of dinosaur paleontology in the mid-20th century. The discovery of this clearly active, agile predator did much to change the scientific and popular conceptions of dinosaurs, opening the door to speculation that some dinosaurs may have been warm-blooded. This development has been termed the Dinosaur Renaissance. Several years later, Ostrom noted similarities between the hands of Deinonychus and that of birds, an observation which led him to revive the hypothesis that birds are descended from dinosaurs. Almost fifty years later, this idea is almost universally accepted.

Because of its extremely bird-like anatomy and close relationship to other dromaeosaurids, paleontologists hypothesize that Deinonychus was probably covered in feathers. Clear fossil evidence of modern avian-style feathers exists for several related dromaeosaurids, including Velociraptor and Microraptor, though no direct evidence is yet known for Deinonychus itself. When conducting studies of such areas as the range of motion in the arms, paleontologists like Phil Senter have taken the likely presence of wing feathers (as present in all known dromaeosaurids with skin impressions) into consideration.

Description

Campione and his colleagues proposed a higher mass estimate of  based on femur and humerus circumference. The skull was equipped with powerful jaws lined with around seventy curved, blade-like teeth. Studies of the skull have progressed a great deal over the decades. Ostrom reconstructed the partial, imperfectly preserved skulls that he had as triangular, broad, and fairly similar to Allosaurus. Additional Deinonychus skull material and closely related species found with good three-dimensional preservation show that the palate was more vaulted than Ostrom thought, making the snout far narrower, while the jugals flared out broadly, giving it high stereoscopic vision. The skull of Deinonychus was different from that of Velociraptor, however, in that it had a more robust skull roof, like that of Dromaeosaurus, and did not have the depressed nasals of Velociraptor. Both the skull and the lower jaw had fenestrae (skull openings) which were filled with muscles and reduced the skull’s weight. In Deinonychus, the antorbital fenestra, the skull opening between the eye and nostril, was particularly large.

Deinonychus possessed large "hands" (manus) with three claws on each finger. The first digit was shortest and the second was longest. Each foot bore a sickle-shaped claw on the second tow, which was probably used during predation.

No skin impressions have ever been found in association with fossils of Deinonychus. Nevertheless, highly supported evidence suggests that dromaeosaurids, including Deinonychus, had feathers. The genus Microraptor is both older geologically and more primitive phylogenetically than Deinonychus, and within the same family. Multiple fossils of Microraptor preserve pennaceous, vaned feathers like those of modern birds on the arms, legs, and tail, along with covert and contour feathers. Velociraptor is geologically younger than Deinonychus, but even more closely related. A specimen of Velociraptor has been found with quill knobs on the left ulna. Quill knobs are where the follicular ligaments are attached, and are a direct indicator of feathers of modern aspect.

Classification
Deinonychus antirrhopus is one of the best known dromaeosaurid species, and also a close relative of the smaller Velociraptor, which is found in younger, Late Cretaceous rock formations of Central Asia. The clade they form is called Velociraptorinae. The subfamily name Velociraptorinae was first coined by Rinchen Barsbold in 1983 and originally contained the single genus Velociraptor. Later, Phil Currie included most dromaeosaurids. Two Late Cretaceous genera, Tsaagan from Mongolia and Saurornitholestes from North America, may also be close relatives, but the latter is poorly known and hard to classify. Velociraptor and its allies are regarded as using their claws more than their skulls as killing tools, as opposed to dromaeosaurines like Dromaeosaurus, which have stockier skulls and larger teeth. Phylogenetically, dromaeosaurids represent one of the non-avialan dinosaur groups most closely related to birds. The cladogram below follows a 2015 analysis by paleontologists Robert DePalma, David Burnham, Larry Martin, Peter Larson, and Robert Bakker, using updated data from the Theropod Working Group. This study currently classifies Deinonychus as a member of Dromaeosaurinae.

 
 
A 2021 study of the dromaeosaurid Kansaignathus recovered Deinonychus as a velociraptorine rather than a dromaeosaurine, with Kansaignathus being an intermediate basal form more advanced than Deinonychus but more primitive than Velociraptor. The cladogram below showcases these newly described relationships: 
{{clade|{{clade
   |1=Mahakala
   |label2=Halszkaraptorinae
   |2=
   |3={{clade
     |1=Microraptorinae
     |2={{clade
       |1=Unenlagiinae
       |2={{clade
         |1=Bambiraptor
         |2={{clade
           |1=Dakotaraptor
           |label2=Eudromaeosauria
           |2={{clade
             |1=Saurornitholestinae
             |2={{clade
               |1=Dromaeosaurinae
               |label2=Velociraptorinae
               |2={{clade
                 |1=Deinonychus
                 |2= }} }} }} }}  }} }} }} }}|label1=Dromaeosauridae|style=font-size: 85%; line-height:85%}}

A study in 2022 however, reclassified Deinonychus as a basal member of Dromaeosaurinae again.

Paleobiology

Predatory behaviorDeinonychus teeth found in association with fossils of the ornithopod dinosaur Tenontosaurus are quite common in the Cloverly Formation. Two quarries have been discovered preserving fairly complete Deinonychus fossils near Tenontosaurus fossils. The first, the Yale quarry in the Cloverly of Montana, includes numerous teeth, four adult Deinonychus and one juvenile Deinonychus. The association of this number of Deinonychus skeletons in a single quarry suggests that Deinonychus may have fed on that animal, and perhaps even hunted it. Ostrom and Maxwell have even used this information to speculate that Deinonychus might have lived and hunted in packs. The second such quarry, from the Antlers Formation of Oklahoma, contains six partial skeletons of tenontosaurs of various sizes, along with one partial skeleton and numerous teeth of Deinonychus. One Tenontosaurus humerus even bears what might be Deinonychus tooth marks. Brinkman et al. (1998) point out that Deinonychus had an adult mass of 70–100 kilograms, whereas adult tenontosaurs were 1–4 metric tons. A solitary Deinonychus could not kill an adult tenontosaur, suggesting that pack hunting was possible method of hunting.

A 2007 study by Roach and Brinkman has called into question the cooperative pack hunting behavior of Deinonychus, based on what is known of modern carnivore hunting and the taphonomy of tenontosaur sites. Modern archosaurs (birds and crocodiles) and Komodo dragons typically display little cooperative hunting; instead, they are usually either solitary hunters, or are drawn to previously killed carcasses, where much conflict occurs between individuals of the same species. For example, in situations where groups of Komodo dragons are eating together, the largest individuals eat first and will attack or even kill smaller Komodos that attempt to feed. If the smaller animal is killed in the process, it is then cannibalized. When this information is applied to the tenontosaur sites, it appears that what is found is consistent with Deinonychus having a Komodo or crocodile-like feeding strategy. Deinonychus skeletal remains found at these sites are from subadults, with missing parts consistent with having been eaten by other Deinonychus. On the other hand, a paper by Li et al. describes track sites with similar Deinonychus foot spacing and parallel trackways, implying gregarious pack behavior instead of uncoordinated mobbing behavior. Contrary to the claim that crocodilians do not hunt cooperatively, they have actually been observed to hunt cooperatively, meaning that the notion of infighting, competition for food and cannibalism ruling out cooperative feeding, may actually be a false dichotomy.

In 2009, Manning and colleagues interpreted dromaeosaur claw tips as functioning as a puncture and gripping element, whereas the expanded rear portion of the claw transferred load stress through the structure. They argue that the anatomy, form, and function of the foot's recurved second toe and hand claws of dromaeosaurs support a prey capture, grappling, or even climbing function. The team also suggest that a ratchet-like ‘‘locking’’ ligament might have provided an energy-efficient way for dromaeosaurs to hook their recurved second toe claw into theirprey. Shifting body weight passively locked the claws, allowing their jaws to dispatch the prey. They conclude that the enhanced climbing abilities of dromaeosaur dinosaurs supported a scansorial (climbing) phase in the evolution of flight. In 2011, Denver Fowler and colleagues suggested a new method by which Deinonychus and other dromaeosaurs may have captured and restrained prey. This model, known as the "raptor prey restraint" (RPR), proposes that dromaeosaurs killed their prey in a very similar manner to extant accipitrid birds of prey, where they leapt onto their quarry, pinned it under their body weight, and gripped it tightly with the large, sickle-shaped claws. Like accipitrids, the dromaeosaur would then begin to feed on the animal while it’s still alive, eventually killing it through severe blood loss and organ failure. This proposal is based primarily on comparisons between the morphology and proportions of the feet and legs of dromaeosaurs to several groups of extant birds of prey with known predatory behaviors. Fowler found that the feet and legs of dromaeosaurs most closely resemble those of eagles and hawks, especially in terms of having an enlarged second claw and a similar range of grasping motion. However, the short metatarsus and foot strength would have been more similar to that of owls. The RPR method of predation would be consistent with other aspects of Deinonychus's anatomy, such as their unusual jaw and arm morphology. The arms were likely covered in long feathers, and may have been used as flapping stabilizers for balance while on top of struggling prey, along with the stiff counterbalancing tail. Its jaws, thought to have had a comparatively weak bite force, might be used for saw motion bites, like the modern Komodo dragon which also has a weak bite force, to finish off its prey if its kicks were not powerful enough.

Bite force

Bite force estimates for Deinonychus were first produced in 2005, based on reconstructed jaw musculature. This study concluded that Deinonychus likely had a maximum bite force only 15% that of the modern American alligator. A 2010 study by Paul Gignac and colleagues attempted to estimate the bite force based directly on newly discovered Deinonychus tooth puncture marks in the bones of a Tenontosaurus. These puncture marks came from a large individual and provided the first evidence that large Deinonychus could bite through bone. Using the tooth marks, Gignac's team were able to determine that the bite force of Deinonychus was significantly higher than earlier studies had once estimated by biomechanical studies alone. They found the bite force of Deinonychus to be between 4,100 to 8,200 newtons, greater than living carnivorous mammals including the hyena, and equivalent to a similarly-sized alligator.

Gignac and colleagues also noted, however, that bone puncture marks from Deinonychus are relatively rare, and unlike larger theropods with many known puncture marks like Tyrannosaurus, Deinonychus probably did not frequently bite through or eat the bones of its prey. Instead, they probably used their strong bite force for defense or to capture prey, rather than for feeding.

Limb function

Despite being the most distinctive feature of Deinonychus, the shape and curvature of the sickle claw varies between specimens. The type specimen described by Ostrom in 1969 has a strongly curved sickle claw, while a newer specimen described in 1976 had a claw with much weaker curvature, more similar in profile with the 'normal' claws on the remaining toes. Ostrom suggested that this difference in the size and shape of the sickle claws could be due to individual, sexual, or age-related variation, but admitted he could not be sure.

There is anatomical and trackway evidence that this talon was held off the ground while the dinosaur walked on the third and fourth toes.

Ostrom suggested that Deinonychus could kick with the sickle claw to cut and slash at its prey. Some researchers even suggested that the talon was used to disembowel large ceratopsian dinosaurs. Other studies have suggested that the sickle claws were not used to slash but rather to stab the victim. In 2005, Manning and colleagues ran tests on a robotic replica that precisely matched the anatomy of Deinonychus and Velociraptor, using hydraulic rams to make the robot strike the flesh of a pig carcass. In these tests, the talons made only shallow punctures and could not cut or slash. The authors suggested that the talons would have been more effective in climbing than in dealing killing blows. In 2009, Manning and colleagues undertook additional analysis dromaeosaur claw function, using a numerical modelling approach to generate a 3D finite element stress/strain map of a Velociraptor hand claw. They went on to quantitatively evaluate the mechanical behavior of dromaeosaur claws and their function. They state that dromaeosaur claws were well-adapted for climbing as they were resistant to forces acting in a single (longitudinal) plane, due to gravity.

Ostrom compared Deinonychus to ostriches and cassowaries. He noted that these bird species can inflict serious injury with the large claw on their second toes. Ostrom cited Gilliard (1958) in saying that they can sever an arm or disembowel a man. Kofron (1999 and 2003) studied 241 documented cassowary attacks and found that one human and two dogs had been killed, but no evidence that cassowaries can disembowel or dismember other animals. Cassowaries use their claws to defend themselves, to attack threatening animals, and in agonistic displays such as the Bowed Threat Display. The seriema also has an enlarged second toe claw, using it to tear apart small prey items for ease of swallowing. In 2011, a study suggested that the sickle claw would likely have been used to pin down prey while biting it, rather than as a slashing weapon.

Biomechanical studies by Ken Carpenter in 2002 confirmed that the most likely function of the arms in predation was grasping, as their great lengths would have permitted longer reach than in most other theropods. The rather large and elongated coracoid, indicating powerful arm muscles, further strengthened this interpretation. Carpenter's biomechanical studies using bone casts also showed that Deinonychus could not fold its arms against its body like a bird ("avian folding"), contrary to what was inferred from the earlier 1985 descriptions by Jacques Gauthier and Gregory S. Paul in 1988.

Studies by Phil Senter in 2006 indicated that the arms of Deinonychus could be used not only for grasping, but also for clutching objects towards the chest. If Deinonychus had feathered fingers and wings, the feathers would have limited the range of motion of the forelimbs to a slight degree. For example, when Deinonychus extended its arm forward, the 'palm' of the hand automatically rotated to an upward-facing position. This would have caused one wing to block the other if both forelimbs were extended at the same time, leading Senter to conclude that clutching objects to the chest would have only been accomplished with one arm at a time. The function of the fingers would also have been limited by the feathers; for example, only the third finger of each hand could have been employed in activities such as probing crevices for small prey items, and only in a position perpendicular to the main wing. Alan Gishlick, in a 2001 study of Deinonychus arm mechanics, found that even if large wing feathers were present, the grasping ability of the hand would not have been significantly hindered. Grasping would have instead been accomplished perpendicular to the wing, and objects would likely have been held by both hands simultaneously in a "bear hug" fashion. These findings have been supported by the later forelimb studies by Carpenter and Senter. In a 2001 study conducted by Bruce Rothschild and other paleontologists, 43 hand bones and 52 foot bones referred to Deinonychus were examined for signs of stress fracture, and none were found. The second phalanx of the second toe in the specimen YPM 5205 has a healed fracture.

Parsons and Parsons have shown that juvenile and sub-adult specimens of Deinonychus display some morphological differences from the adults. For instance, the arms of the younger specimens were proportionally longer than those of the adults, a possible indication of difference in behavior between young and adults. Another example of this could be the function of the pedal claws. Parsons and Parsons have suggested that the claw curvature (which Ostrom, in 1976, had already shown was different between specimens) was possibly higher for juvenile Deinonychus, as this could help them climb up trees, and that the claws became straighter as the animal grew up and started to live solely on the ground. This was based on the hypothesis that some small dromaeosaurids used their pedal claws for climbing.

Flight
In a 2015 paper, it was reported after further analysis of immature fossils that the open and mobile nature of the shoulder joint might have meant that young Deinonychus were capable of some form of flight.

Speed

Dromaeosaurids, especially Deinonychus, are often depicted as unusually fast-running animals in the popular media, and Ostrom himself speculated that Deinonychus was fleet-footed in his original description. However, when first described, a complete leg of Deinonychus had not been found, and Ostrom's speculation about the length of the femur (upper leg bone) later proved to have been an overestimate. In a later study, Ostrom noted that the ratio of the femur to the tibia (lower leg bone) is not as important in determining speed as the relative length of the foot and lower leg. In modern fleet-footed birds, like the ostrich, the foot-tibia ratio is .95. In unusually fast-running dinosaurs, like Struthiomimus, the ratio is .68, but in Deinonychus the ratio is .48. Ostrom stated that the "only reasonable conclusion" is that Deinonychus, while far from slow-moving, was not particularly fast compared to other dinosaurs, and certainly not as fast as modern flightless birds.

The low foot to lower leg ratio in Deinonychus is due partly to an unusually short metatarsus (upper foot bones). The ratio is actually larger in smaller individuals than in larger ones. Ostrom suggested that the short metatarsus may be related to the function of the sickle claw, and used the fact that it appears to get shorter as individuals aged as support for this. He interpreted all these features—the short second toe with enlarged claw, short metatarsus, etc.—as support for the use of the hind leg as an offensive weapon, where the sickle claw would strike downwards and backwards, and the leg pulled back and down at the same time, slashing and tearing at the prey. Ostrom suggested that the short metatarsus reduced overall stress on the leg bones during such an attack, and interpreted the unusual arrangement of muscle attachments in the Deinonychus leg as support for his idea that a different set of muscles was used in the predatory stroke than in walking or running. Therefore, Ostrom concluded that the legs of Deinonychus represented a balance between running adaptations needed for an agile predator, and stress-reducing features to compensate for its unique foot weapon.

In his 1981 study of Canadian dinosaur footprints, Richard Kool produced rough walking speed estimates based on several trackways made by different species in the Gething Formation of British Columbia. Kool estimated one of these trackways, representing the ichnospecies Irenichnites gracilis (which may have been made by Deinonychus), to have a walking speed of 10.1 kilometers per hour (6 miles per hour).

Eggs

The identification, in 2000, of a probable Deinonychus egg associated with one of the original specimens allowed comparison with other theropod dinosaurs in terms of egg structure, nesting, and reproduction. In their 2006 examination of the specimen, Grellet-Tinner and Makovicky examined the possibility that the dromaeosaurid had been feeding on the egg, or that the egg fragments had been associated with the Deinonychus skeleton by coincidence. They dismissed the idea that the egg had been a meal for the theropod, noting that the fragments were sandwiched between the belly ribs and forelimb bones, making it impossible that they represented contents of the animal's stomach. In addition, the manner in which the egg had been crushed and fragmented indicated that it had been intact at the time of burial, and was broken by the fossilization process. The idea that the egg was randomly associated with the dinosaur was also found to be unlikely; the bones surrounding the egg had not been scattered or disarticulated, but remained fairly intact relative to their positions in life, indicating that the area around and including the egg was not disturbed during preservation. The fact that these bones were belly ribs (gastralia), which are very rarely found articulated, supported this interpretation. All the evidence, according to Grellet-Tinner and Makovicky, indicates that the egg was intact beneath the body of the Deinonychus when it was buried. It is possible that this represents brooding or nesting behavior in Deinonychus similar to that seen in the related troodontids and oviraptorids, or that the egg was in fact inside the oviduct when the animal died.

Examination of the Deinonychus egg's microstructure confirms that it belonged to a theropod, since it shares characteristics with other known theropod eggs and shows dissimilarities with ornithischian and sauropod eggs. Compared to other maniraptoran theropods, the egg of Deinonychus is more similar to those of oviraptorids than to those of troodontids, despite studies that show the latter are more closely related to dromaeosaurids like Deinonychus. While the egg was too badly crushed to accurately determine its size, Grellet-Tinner and Makovicky estimated a diameter of about  based on the width of the pelvic canal through which the egg had to have passed. This size is similar to the  diameter of the largest Citipati (an oviraptorid) eggs; Citipati and Deinonychus also shared the same overall body size, supporting this estimate. Additionally, the thicknesses of Citipati and Deinonychus eggshells are almost identical, and since shell thickness correlates with egg volume, this further supports the idea that the eggs of these two animals were about the same size.

A study published in November 2018 by Norell, Yang and Wiemann et al., indicates that Deinonychus laid blue eggs, likely to camouflage them as well as creating open nests. The study also indicates that Deinonychus and other dinosaurs that created open nests likely represent an origin of color in modern bird eggs as an adaptation both for recognition and camouflage against predators.

Lifecycle
A study on Deinonychus tooth isotopes suggests precociality in the genus. The isotopes examined for different aged specimens indicates that adults and juveniles had different diets across the various age groups. As the data suggests that Deinonychus had a more typical reptilian set of life stages, the examinations also have been stated to indicate a lack of complex, cooperative social behavior found in mammalian terrestrial pack-hunters such as wolves.

Paleoenvironment

Geological evidence suggests that Deinonychus inhabited a floodplain or swamplike habitat. The paleoenvironment of both the upper Cloverly Formation and the Antlers Formation, in which remains of Deinonychus have been found, consisted of tropical or sub-tropical forests, deltas and lagoons, similar to today's Louisiana. Other animals Deinonychus shared its world with included herbivorous dinosaurs such as the armored Sauropelta and the ornithopods Zephyrosaurus and Tenontosaurus. In Oklahoma, the ecosystem of Deinonychus also included the large theropod Acrocanthosaurus, the huge sauropod Sauroposeidon, the crocodilians Goniopholis and Paluxysuchus, and the gar Lepisosteus. If the teeth found in Maryland truly are those of Deinonychus, then its contemporaries would include Astrodon and Priconodon, a nodosaur known only from teeth. The middle portion of the Cloverly Formation ranges in age from 115 ± 10 Ma near the base to 108.5 ± 0.2 Ma near the top.

Cultural significanceDeinonychus were featured prominently in the novel Carnosaur by Harry Adam Knight and its film adaption, along with the novels Jurassic Park and The Lost World by Michael Crichton and their film adaptations, directed by Steven Spielberg. Crichton ultimately chose to use the name Velociraptor for these dinosaurs, rather than Deinonychus. Crichton had met with John Ostrom several times during the writing process to discuss details of the possible range of behaviors and life appearance of Deinonychus. Crichton at one point apologetically told Ostrom that he had decided to use the name Velociraptor in place of Deinonychus for his book, because he felt the former name was "more dramatic". Despite this, according to Ostrom, Crichton stated that the Velociraptor of the novel was based on Deinonychus in almost every detail, and that only the name had been changed.

The Jurassic Park filmmakers followed suit, designing the film's models based almost entirely on Deinonychus instead of the actual Velociraptor, and they reportedly requested all of Ostrom's published papers on Deinonychus during production. As a result, they portrayed the film's dinosaurs with the exaggerated size, proportions, and snout shape of Deinonychus''.

See also

 Timeline of dromaeosaurid research
 Dromaeosauridae
 John Ostrom

References

External links

Eudromaeosaurs
Cloverly fauna
Early Cretaceous dinosaurs of North America
Fossil taxa described in 1969
Taxa named by John Ostrom